Per Blom (born June 27, 1949) is a retired Norwegian sprint canoer who competed in the early 1970s. At the 1972 Summer Olympics in Munich, he was disqualified in the heats of the K-2 1000 m event.

References
Sports-reference.com profile

1949 births
Canoeists at the 1972 Summer Olympics
Living people
Norwegian male canoeists
Olympic canoeists of Norway
Place of birth missing (living people)
20th-century Norwegian people